Kʼinich Kan Bahlam III, (fl. c.751), was an ajaw of the Maya city of Palenque. He ruled c.751. Ruler is not mentioned in any monument at Palenque but only one text at Pomona, that suggest his reign was short or troubled.

Notes

Sources 

Rulers of Palenque
8th-century monarchs in North America
Year of death unknown
8th century in the Maya civilization